Kosovo became a member of the International University Sports Federation in 2017 and made its debut at the 2019 Summer Universiade.

Medal count

Summer Universiade
Kosovo first competed in the Summer Universiade in 2019.

Winter Universiade
Following the cancellation of the 2021 edition, Kosovo is expected to make its debut at the Winter Universiade in 2025.

See also
Kosovo at the Olympics
Kosovo at the Youth Olympics
Kosovo at the European Games
Kosovo at the Mediterranean Games
Sport in Kosovo

References